The 58th Directors Guild of America Awards, honoring the outstanding directorial achievements in films, documentary and television in 2005, were presented on January 28, 2006, at the Hyatt Regency Century Plaza. The ceremony was hosted by Carl Reiner. The nominees in the feature film category were announced on January 5, 2006 and the other nominations were announced starting on January 9, 2006.

The award for Outstanding Directorial Achievement in Reality Programs was first introduced at this ceremony.

Winners and nominees

Film

Television

Commercials

Lifetime Achievement in Feature Film
 Clint Eastwood

Lifetime Achievement in Sports Direction
 Joseph R. Aceti

Frank Capra Achievement Award
 Jerry H. Ziesmer

Franklin J. Schaffner Achievement Award
 Donald E. Jacob

References

External links
 

Directors Guild of America Awards
2005 film awards
2005 guild awards
2005 television awards
2005 in American cinema
2005 in American television
2005 awards in the United States